Nüsken is a German surname. Notable people with the surname include:

 Gertrud Nüsken (1917–1972), German chess master
 Sjoeke Nüsken (born 2001), German footballer

German-language surnames